Robert Edward Jones (born July 5, 1927) is an American politician and judge in Oregon. He serves as a Senior United States district judge of the United States District Court for the District of Oregon in Portland. A Portland native, he previously served as the 84th justice of the Oregon Supreme Court and as a member of the Oregon House of Representatives.

Jones was nominated by President George H. W. Bush on February 20, 1990, to a seat vacated by James M. Burns. He was confirmed by the United States Senate on April 27, 1990, and received commission on April 30, 1990. Assumed senior status on May 1, 2000.

Early life
Jones was born in 1927 in Portland, Oregon. There he attended Grant High School. After high school Jones joined the United States Naval Reserve and attended the University of Hawaii where he earned a Bachelor of Arts degree in 1949. He then enrolled at the Northwestern School of Law at Lewis & Clark College in Portland where he graduated in 1953 with a Bachelor of Laws. While in the Naval Reserve he served in the Judge Advocate General Corps from 1949 to 1987.

Legal career
After law school Jones entered private legal practice in Portland where he remained until 1963. In 1963 he entered politics when he served in the Oregon House of Representatives as a Republican representing Portland. He resigned, however, before the special session held later that year. Jones resigned in order to become a circuit judge in Multnomah County, where he remained until 1982.

State judicial service
On December 16, 1982, Jones was appointed by Oregon Governor Victor G. Atiyeh to the Oregon Supreme Court. He replaced Jacob Tanzer who had resigned. One of the most notable cases Jones judged was State v. Henry, which declared unconstitutional all Oregon obscenity laws then binding. Jones served on Oregon's highest court until April 30, 1990, when he resigned.

Federal judicial service
On February 20, 1990, Jones was nominated to become a United States District Judge of the United States District Court for the District of Oregon by nominated by President George H. W. Bush to replace Judge James M. Burns. He was confirmed by the United States Senate on April 27 and then received his federal commission on April 30, 1990. Jones took senior status on May 1, 2000.

Notable cases
As a federal judge he upheld Oregon's Assisted Suicide law against a federal challenge in April 2002. U.S. Attorney General John Ashcroft had challenged the law based on federal laws concerning controlled substances. In 2003 to 2004 he was the presiding judge of the case involving Mike Hawash of the Portland Seven in which Hawash received a seven-year sentence for conspiring to fight in Afghanistan for the Taliban against United States forces. Then in 2005 he ruled against the Bush administration in their efforts to reduce protection of gray wolves under the Endangered Species Act.

Other service
Jones is a former president of the Oregon Trial Lawyers Association, an adjunct member of the Lewis & Clark Law School faculty, part of the National Judicial College, and a faculty member of the American Academy of Judicial Education.

References

External links

OHSU Scientist Makes Recommendations To Improve Expert Testimony In The Courtroom
Mass tort litigation and inquisitorial justice
Portland Tribune: Terror judge: Bring on the big questions

1927 births
Living people
Judges of the United States District Court for the District of Oregon
Lawyers from Portland, Oregon
Lewis & Clark Law School alumni
Members of the Oregon House of Representatives
Justices of the Oregon Supreme Court
Oregon state court judges
United States district court judges appointed by George H. W. Bush
20th-century American judges
United States Navy officers
University of Hawaiʻi alumni
21st-century American judges
United States Navy personnel of World War II
United States Navy reservists
United States Navy Judge Advocate General's Corps
Grant High School (Portland, Oregon) alumni